SQLXML may refer to:
 SQL/XML, extension to the SQL standard that specifies SQL-based extensions for using XML in conjunction with SQL
 SQLXML, a technology to support XML for Microsoft SQL Server 2000, being mostly deprecated (see Microsoft Data Access Components)